Lucien Salomon Joseph Grenier (born November 3, 1946) is a Canadian former professional ice hockey winger who played 151 games in the National Hockey League (NHL).  

Grenier played for the Montreal Canadiens and Los Angeles Kings. He won the Stanley Cup in 1969 with the Canadiens. Grenier only played two playoff games, and did not dress in the regular season; his name was left off the Cup although he qualified to be listed.

External links 

1946 births
Canadian ice hockey right wingers
Ice hockey people from Quebec
Living people
Los Angeles Kings players
Montreal Canadiens players
People from Abitibi-Témiscamingue
Stanley Cup champions